Bojan Dojkić (born 25 October 1984, in Pirot) is a Serbian footballer who currently plays as a defender for Radnički Pirot.

Career
Dojkić started his football career at Hajduk Kula, before transferred to Radnički Niš in January 2010.

In July 2010, it was announced that Bojan finally signed for Greek side Trikala. He made his debut in Greece during the 2010–2011 season on September 12, 2010 in a 0–1 away loss against Panetolikos. Dojkić appeared 6 times for Trikala, before signed with Bulgarian Lokomotiv Plovdiv on 30 December 2010. Now playing for FK Radnički from Niš.

References

External links
 

1984 births
Living people
People from Pirot
Serbian footballers
Association football defenders
FK Hajduk Kula players
FK Radnički Niš players
PFC Lokomotiv Plovdiv players
Serbian SuperLiga players
First Professional Football League (Bulgaria) players
Serbian expatriate footballers
Expatriate footballers in Greece
Expatriate footballers in Bulgaria